The Ruger LCR is a compact revolver built by Sturm, Ruger & Co. and announced in January 2009. LCR stands for "Lightweight Compact Revolver". It incorporates several novel features such as a polymer grip and trigger housing, monolithic receiver, and constant force trigger. At , the LCR is nearly 50% lighter than the stainless steel SP101, as only the barrel and fluted cylinder are made of stainless steel.

Description
The LCR operates in double-action only (DAO), as the hammer is concealed within the frame handle's fire control housing and cannot be cocked prior to firing. In order to create a lighter trigger pull, it features a friction-reducing cam.

The LCR was originally released chambered in .38 Special. In June 2010, Ruger released the LCR-357 chambered for .357 Magnum. With the rising popularity of the LCR, in December 2011 Ruger announced the new Ruger LCR 22, chambered in .22 LR with an eight-round capacity. In the summer of 2013, Ruger introduced a .22 Winchester Magnum Rimfire (WMR) version of the LCR, with a six-round capacity. In the autumn of 2014, Ruger introduced a five-shot 9mm Luger version, and a six-shot .327 Federal Magnum version a year later.

The LCR frame is aluminum alloy and synthetic glass-filled polymer finished in matte black with Synergistic Hard Coat. Per the Ruger website, the "monolithic frame is made from aerospace-grade, 7000 series aluminum in .22 LR, .22 Magnum and .38 Spl +P models and from 400 series stainless steel in the powerful .357 Magnum, 9mm Luger and .327 Federal Magnum models."

LCRx
Ruger announced the LCRx variant in December 2013, which features an external hammer, allowing it to be fired in single-action or double-action. All the other features of the LCR are also present in the LCRx including the polymer grip, trigger housing, and fluted stainless steel cylinder. A  barrel version of the LCRx in .357 Magnum and a  barrel version in .22 Magnum and .22 LR became available in April 2017. The 1.87-inch barrel version became available as a five-shot 9mm Luger and a six-shot .327 Federal Magnum in the fall of 2017.

References

External links

 Ruger LCR official page
 Review of the Ruger LCR from American Rifleman

.357 Magnum firearms
.38 Special firearms
.22 LR revolvers
9mm Parabellum revolvers
Ruger revolvers
Weapons and ammunition introduced in 2010